The discography of Muse, an English rock band, consists of nine studio albums, two live albums, one compilation album, one box set, five extended plays (EPs), 44 singles, two video albums, 61 music videos and four other appearances. Formed in Teignmouth, Devon in 1994, the band signed with Taste Media before releasing their debut album Showbiz in 1999. The album was a success across Europe, and in the UK reached number 29 on the UK Albums Chart, as well as being certified platinum by the British Phonographic Industry (BPI). Five singles were released from Showbiz, with final release "Unintended" the band's first to reach the top 20 on the UK Singles Chart. Muse released their second album Origin of Symmetry in 2001, which reached number 3 on the UK Albums Chart and was certified double platinum by the BPI. The album's first three singles, "Plug In Baby", "New Born" and "Bliss", all reached the UK top 25.

In 2002 the band released their first live video album Hullabaloo: Live at Le Zenith, Paris, alongside the tie-in compilation album Hullabaloo Soundtrack. The video reached number 2 on the UK Music Video Chart, while the soundtrack album reached number 10 on the UK Albums Chart. The group's third studio album Absolution, issued on East West Records, was released in 2003 and was the band's first release to top the UK Albums Chart. The album only reached number 103 on the US Billboard 200, but has been certified platinum by the Recording Industry Association of America (RIAA). "Time Is Running Out" was the band's first single to reach the UK Singles Chart top ten, peaking at number 8. Absolution Tour, a live video filmed on the Absolution promotional cycle, reached number 9 on the UK Music Video Chart.

After founding their own label, Helium-3, and signing with Warner Bros. Records, Muse released Black Holes and Revelations in 2006. The album was a commercial success, topping several albums charts and reaching the top ten on the Billboard 200. Lead single "Supermassive Black Hole" is the band's most successful on the UK Singles Chart to date, peaking at number 4. The band's first live album HAARP was released in 2008, reaching number 2 on the UK Albums Chart. The Resistance followed in 2009, topping several countries' album charts for the first time, as well as reaching number 3 in the US. The first single from the album, "Uprising", was the band's first to reach the top 40 on the Billboard Hot 100, as well as their fourth to reach the top ten in the UK. Muse have continued to enjoy high levels of commercial success in recent years – The 2nd Law and Drones both topped the UK Albums Chart, while the latter was the group's first release to reach number one on the Billboard 200.

Albums

Studio albums

Live albums

Compilation albums

Box sets

Extended plays

Singles

Other charted songs

Videos

Video albums

Music videos

Other appearances

See also
List of songs recorded by Muse

Footnotes

References

External links
Muse discography on the band's official website
Muse discography on AllMusic
Muse discography on Discogs
Muse discography on MusicBrainz

Discographies of British artists
Rock music group discographies
Discography